Agostinho Sampaio de Sá (8 January 1897 – 28 April 1960) was a Brazilian water polo player. He competed in the men's tournament at the 1920 Summer Olympics.

See also
 Brazil men's Olympic water polo team records and statistics
 List of men's Olympic water polo tournament goalkeepers

References

External links
 

1897 births
1960 deaths
Brazilian male water polo players
Water polo goalkeepers
Olympic water polo players of Brazil
Water polo players at the 1920 Summer Olympics
Place of birth missing